The Academy of Interactive Arts & Sciences (AIAS) is a non-profit organization of video game industry professionals. It organizes the annual Design Innovate Communicate Entertain summit, better known as D.I.C.E., which includes the presentations of the D.I.C.E. Awards.

History 
AIAS was originally founded in 1992 by Andrew Zucker, a lawyer in the entertainment industry. AIAS co-promoted numerous events with organizations such as the Academy of Television Arts and Sciences, the Directors Guild of America and Women in Film. Their first awards show program, "Cybermania '94", which was hosted by Leslie Nielsen and Jonathan Taylor Thomas, was broadcast on TBS. While a second show was run in 1995, and was the first awards program to be streamed over the Web, it drew far less audiences as the first.

Video game industry leaders decided that they wanted to reform AIAS as a non-profit organization for the video game industry. The effort was backed by Peter Main of Nintendo, Tom Kalinske of Sega, and Doug Lowenstein, founder of the Entertainment Software Association (ESA), and with funding support from ESA. AIAS was formally refounded in 1996, with game developer Glenn Entis as its first president. Initially, in 1998, AIAS' role was to handle the awards, originally known as the Interactive Achievement Awards. These awards were nominated and selected by game developers that are members of the organization themselves, mimicking the means which the Academy Awards are voted upon by its members.

Around 2000, the ESA pulled out of funding AIAS, leading AIAS members Richard Hilleman and Lorne Lanning to suggest that AIAS create the D.I.C.E. Summit (short for "Design Innovate Communicate Entertain"), a convention centered around the presentation of the awards as a means to providing funding for the organization. The Summit was aimed at industry executives and lead developers as a means to provide networking between various companies The D.I.C.E. Summit launched in 2002 in Las Vegas, Nevada and has been run on an annual basis since. In addition to video games, AIAS saw these summits as a way to connect video games to other entertainment industries.

Joseph Olin served as the AIAS president from 2004 to 2010; following his departure, Martin Rae was named president in 2012. Rae opted to implement a number of changes to the Summit, shorting talk times to give more attention to the speakers, and rebranding the awards as the D.I.C.E. Awards for the 2013 summit. Mike Fischer replaced Rae as president in 2016.

As of 2017, AIAS's mission is "to promote and advance the worldwide interactive entertainment community, recognize outstanding achievements in the interactive arts and sciences, and host an annual awards show, the DICE Awards, to enhance awareness of games as an interactive art form".

D.I.C.E. Summit 

 
The D.I.C.E. summit is an annual multi-day gathering of video game executives held in Las Vegas, Nevada. Established in 2002 by AIAS, the conference is host to the annual Entertainment Software Association's Interactive Achievement Awards. The conference differs from other conferences in the industry in its emphasis on the business and production end of the industry, with a focus on trends and innovations in video game design. The conference specializes in providing a more intimate, orderly venue for select industry leaders to network.

Structure 
In 2007, a keynote speaker was added to open the event, which had traditionally begun with recreation before the introduction of presentations and panels.

Corporate members 

 Activision Blizzard
 Annapurna Interactive
 Bethesda Softworks
 Blind Squirrel Games
 Bungie
 Electronic Arts
 Enhance Games
 Epic Games
 Gearbox Software
 GoodbyeWorld Games
 Grumpy Pixel
 iNK Stories
 Insomniac Games
 Kabam
 MWM
 Netmarble
 Ninja Theory
 Nintendo
 Obsidian Entertainment
 ProbablyMonsters
 Proletariat
 Ready at Dawn
 Riot Games
 Romero Games
 Schell Games
 Skydance Interactive
 Sony Computer Entertainment
 Square Enix
 Take-Two Interactive
 That's No Moon
 Ubisoft
 Valve
 Wargaming
 Warner Bros. Interactive Entertainment
 Xbox Game Studios

References

External links 
 

 
Video game organizations
1992 establishments in the United States
Awards established in 1998
Interactive Achievement Award winners
Organizations established in 1992
Video game development
Recurring events established in 2002
Video game trade shows
2002 establishments in Nevada